Christiane Nex (born 30 November 1973) is an Italian ski mountaineer.

Selected results 
 2002:
 3rd, Transacavallo (together with Annamaria Baudena)
 2004:
 1st, Italian Cup 
 1st, Tour du Rutor (together with Gloriana Pellissier)
 3rd, World Championship relay race (together with Annamaria Baudena and Gloriana Pellissier)
 4th, Patrouille des Glaciers (together with Gisella Bendotti and Micol Murachelli)
 6th, World Championship team race (together with Maria Luisa Riva)
 2005:
 1st, Trofeo Mezzalama (together with Gloriana Pellissier and Natascia Leonardi Cortesi)
 1st, Italian Cup 
 2nd, European Championship relay race (together with Gloriana Pellissier and Francesca Martinelli)
 6th, European Championship team race (together with Gloriana Pellissier)
 2007:
 4th, Pierra Menta (together with Laura Chiara Besseghini)
 5th, Tour du Rutor (together with Laura Chiara Besseghini)

References 

1973 births
Living people
Italian female ski mountaineers